Andrew Leeds (born 19 September 1965) is an Australian former rugby union and professional rugby league footballer who played in the 1980s and 1990s. He played for the Western Suburbs Magpies, Parramatta Eels, Penrith Panthers and Wakefield Trinity in rugby league primarily as a goal-kicking ; and for Parramatta Two Blues and Leicester Tigers in rugby union, he represented  14 times in rugby union between 1986 and 1988.

Playing career
Leeds played junior rugby union with the Northmead club, Merrylands JRU and James Ruse Agricultural High School.

Joining the Parramatta Two Blues, Leeds played in the 1985 and 1986 premiership winning sides, and went on to play for Sydney, New South Wales and Australia in 1986. Leeds made three tours with the Wallabies, appearing in fourteen tests, and played in the 1987 Rugby World Cup.

Converting to rugby league, Leeds joined the Parramatta Eels for the 1989 season. He spent 3 years with the Eels, but failed to perform when played at centre or five-eighth. After a year spent with the Penrith Panthers, Leeds joined Wests from 1993 onwards.

Leeds was a player with deceptive pace and skill. He was "safe, reliable and a match-winner with the boot." He scored over 500 points for the Magpies, often in under-performing teams, before announcing his retirement in 1999. He is the fourth highest point-scorer for the club.

In 1997 Leeds returned to rugby union with England's Leicester Tigers, then coached by Bob Dwyer, he played 6 games for the club including 4 games in Premiership Rugby.

Leeds later joined the Wests Tigers as their physiotherapist and rehab manager, and did similar unpaid work with the Two Blues As of 2012, Leeds was the Wests Tigers' longest serving employee, having missed only one game since the club started in 2000.

References

Sources

External links 
Andrew Leeds at NRL Stats

1965 births
Living people
Australia international rugby union players
Australian rugby league players
Australian rugby union players
Australian expatriate sportspeople in England
Leicester Tigers players
Parramatta Eels players
Penrith Panthers players
Rugby league players from Sydney
Rugby union players from Sydney
Rugby league fullbacks
Rugby league centres
People educated at James Ruse Agricultural High School
Rugby union fullbacks
Wakefield Trinity players
Western Suburbs Magpies players